Lorna McKoy is a Jamaican former cricketer who played primarily as a right-arm medium bowler. She appeared in two One Day Internationals for the West Indies, both at the 1997 World Cup. She played domestic cricket for Jamaica.

References

External links
 
 

Living people
Date of birth missing (living people)
Year of birth missing (living people)
Jamaican women cricketers
West Indies women One Day International cricketers